The 1891 Louisville Colonels baseball team finished with a 54–83 record, collapsing back into mediocrity after their pennant winning season of 1890. They finished the season in eighth place in the American Association. After the season, the Association folded and four teams, including Louisville, were admitted into the National League.

Regular season

Season standings

Record vs. opponents

Opening Day lineup

Roster

Player stats

Batting

Starters by position
Note: Pos = Position; G = Games played; AB = At bats; H = Hits; Avg. = Batting average; HR = Home runs; RBI = Runs batted in

Other batters
Note: G = Games played; AB = At bats; H = Hits; Avg. = Batting average; HR = Home runs; RBI = Runs batted in

Pitching

Starting pitchers
Note: G = Games pitched; IP = Innings pitched; W = Wins; L = Losses; ERA = Earned run average; SO = Strikeouts

Other pitchers
Note: G = Games pitched; IP = Innings pitched; W = Wins; L = Losses; ERA = Earned run average; SO = Strikeouts

References
 1891 Louisville Colonels team page at Baseball Reference

Louisville Colonels seasons
Louisville Colonels season
Louisville Colonels